Mischa Salkind-Pearl is an American composer, keyboardist and educator based in Arlington, Massachusetts.

References 

20th-century American male musicians
20th-century American pianists
20th-century classical composers
20th-century classical pianists
21st-century American male musicians
21st-century American pianists
21st-century classical composers
21st-century classical pianists
American classical composers
American classical pianists
American contemporary classical composers
American keyboardists
American male classical composers
American music educators
American opera composers
Classical musicians from Massachusetts
Composers for piano
Living people
Male opera composers
Year of birth missing (living people)